Limbochromis robertsi is a species of cichlid endemic to Ghana where it is found in the upper reaches of the Pra River Basin.  This species has been recorded reaching a maximum length of  TL.  It is currently the only known member of its genus. The specific name honours the American ichthyologist Tyson R. Roberts who collected the type.

References

Endemic fauna of Ghana
Chromidotilapiini
Monotypic freshwater fish genera
Cichlid genera
Taxa named by Humphry Greenwood
Fish described in 1971